The 1932 AAA Championship Car season consisted of six races, beginning in Speedway, Indiana on May 30 and concluding in San Leandro, California on November 13.  The AAA National Champion was Bob Carey and the Indianapolis 500 winner was Fred Frame.

Schedule and results
All races running on Dirt/Brick Oval.

 Scheduled for 100 miles, stopped after 83 miles due to rain.
 Scheduled for 100 miles, stopped after 81 miles due to rain.

Leading National Championship standings

References

See also
 1932 Indianapolis 500

AAA Championship Car season
AAA Championship Car
1932 in American motorsport